La nobla leyczon (La nòbla leiçon in modern Occitan, "The Noble Lesson") is an anonymous text written in Old Occitan. It is the founding document of the Waldensian creed. Its sixth line, ben ha mil & cent an complí entierament (already eleven hundred years have run their course [since Christ died]), places it in the early 12th century but modern scholars now date it between 1190 and 1240. However, the very same line varies according to which of the four manuscripts is studied: the Geneva and Dublin ones say mil e cen (1100) while the Cambridge ones both state mil e cccc cent (1400). Further discrepancies include various anachronisms and the fact that Old Occitan was not spoken in the Lyon region. The manuscript was found in the Piedmontese valleys.

The 479 lines of the poem can be divided into seven parts according to the themes treated : 1-56 deal with the end of the world; 57-229 retrace the history of the Bible; 230-265 tell of the new law; 266-333 narrate Jesus's life and works; 334-360 praise the faithful Christian Church; 361-413 relate the persecutions and the corrupted lives of papists and 414-479 explain what true repentance is.

Opening lines

External links
Full online text
World Council of Churches

References

Occitan literature
Medieval literature
Christian denominations established in the 12th century